is a former Japanese football player.

Club career
Hagimura was born in Mie Prefecture on July 31, 1976. After he dropped out of the University of Tsukuba, he joined Kashiwa Reysol in 1997. He became a regular player as center back in the first season. The club won the championship at the 1999 J.League Cup. In 2000, he also played as defensive midfielder not only center back. However his opportunity to play decreased from 2001. He moved to Kyoto Purple Sanga in 2004 and Albirex Niigata in 2005. He was a regular player at Albirex and he then moved to Tokyo Verdy in 2006. His opportunity to play decreased in 2008 and he retired at the end of the 2008 season.

National team career
In April 1995, when Hagimura was a University of Tsukuba student, he was selected Japan U-20 national team for 1995 World Youth Championship. He played one match as a defender against Chile in the first game.

Club statistics

References

External links

1976 births
Living people
University of Tsukuba alumni
Association football people from Mie Prefecture
Japanese footballers
Japan youth international footballers
J1 League players
J2 League players
Kashiwa Reysol players
Kyoto Sanga FC players
Albirex Niigata players
Tokyo Verdy players
Association football defenders